is a terminal railway station on the Yokkaichi Asunarou Railway Utsube Line in Yokkaichi, Mie Prefecture, Japan, operated by the private railway operator Yokkaichi Asunarou Railway. It is 5.7 rail kilometers from the opposing terminus of the line at Asunarou Yokkaichi Station.

Lines
Utsube Line

Layout
Utsube Station has a side platform. Trains arriving at Utsube Station reverse course back for Asunarou Yokkaichi Station.

Platforms

Adjacent stations

History
Utsube Station was opened on June 22, 1922 as a station on the Mie Railway. On February 11, 1944, due to mergers, station falls under the ownership of Sanco. On February 1, 1964 the Railway division of Sanco splits off and forms separate company, the Mie Electric Railway, which merged with Kintetsu on April 1, 1965. Yokkaichi Asunarou Railway took over the control of the lines and started the operation on April 1, 2015. Until the day before, the lines were operated by Kintetsu Railway, a major private railway operator, as branches of the Kintetsu Nagoya Line.

References

External links

Railway stations in Japan opened in 1922
Railway stations in Mie Prefecture